Yuliya Igorevna Chermoshanskaya (born 6 January 1986 in Bryansk, Russian SFSR) is a Russian track and field athlete. She competed at the 2008 Summer Olympics in the 4x100 metres relay. She is the daughter of former sprinter Galina Malchugina.

Career 
Chermoshanskaya represented Russia at the 2008 Summer Olympics in Beijing, competing in the 4x100 metres relay with partners Aleksandra Fedoriva, Yulia Gushchina and Yevgeniya Polyakova. In their first round heat they placed second behind Jamaica. Their time of 42.87 seconds was also the second time overall out of sixteen participating nations. With this result they qualified for the final in which they sprinted to 42.31 seconds, the first place and the gold medal. Belgium and Nigeria took the other medals.

Chermoshanskaya participated in the 2010 European Championships in Athletics in the 4 x 100 m relay and the 200 metres. In the relay final, along with Yuna Mekhti-Zade, Aleksandra Fedoriva and Yulia Gushchina, they finished fourth behind Ukraine, France and Poland. In the 200 metre competition, she won her heat in a time of 23.10 secs, which was good enough to advance. In her semifinal, she finished second in an improved time of 22.88, behind Ukrainian, Yelizaveta Bryzhina. She then went into the final as the overall, fifth fastest athlete. In the final, she ran a seasonal best of 22.67 which finished her in seventh place, and last of the actual race finishes as Véronique Mang was disqualified for a false start.

Doping case
In May 2016, it was reported that Chermoshanskya was one of 14 Russian athletes, and nine medalists, implicated in doping following the retesting of urine from the 2008 Olympic Games. Chermoshanskya was named by Russian press agency TASS as having failed the retest, which was undertaken following the Russian doping scandal of 2015 and 2016. Under IOC and IAAF rules, Chermonshanskya stood to lose all results, medals and records from the date of the original test to May 2016. In August 2016, she and her three Russian teammates were stripped of their Olympic gold medal.

In May 2017, she was disqualified for two years.

References

External links
 

1986 births
Living people
Athletes (track and field) at the 2008 Summer Olympics
Competitors stripped of Summer Olympics medals
Doping cases in athletics
Olympic athletes of Russia
Sportspeople from Bryansk
Russian female sprinters
Russian sportspeople in doping cases
World Athletics Championships athletes for Russia
Universiade medalists in athletics (track and field)
Universiade gold medalists for Russia
Medalists at the 2005 Summer Universiade
Olympic female sprinters